Abraham Ayomide Marcus (born 2 January 2000) is a Nigerian professional footballer who plays as a forward for Portuguese club Porto B, on loan from Remo Stars. He also plays for the Nigeria national team.

Club career
On 30 August 2021, he joined Portimonense in Portugal's top-tier Primeira Liga on a season-long loan with an option to buy.

On 10 February 2022, he moved on loan until June 2022 with an option to buy from Portimonense to Polish Ekstraklasa side Radomiak Radom.

On 26 May 2022, Marcus moved on a season-long loan with an option to buy to FC Porto B.

International career

On 14 May 2021, the Super Eagles head coach Gernot Rohr included Marcus in his 31-man list for June friendlies. He made his senior international debut in a 1–0 loss to Cameroon on 4 June 2021.

Career statistics

Club

Notes

References

External links

2000 births
Sportspeople from Lagos
Living people
Nigerian footballers
Nigeria international footballers
Association football forwards
C.D. Feirense players
Portimonense S.C. players
Radomiak Radom players
FC Porto B players
Liga Portugal 2 players
Primeira Liga players
Ekstraklasa players
Nigerian expatriate footballers
Expatriate footballers in Portugal
Expatriate footballers in Poland
Nigerian expatriate sportspeople in Portugal
Nigerian expatriate sportspeople in Poland